The Glad Eye is a 1920 British silent comedy film directed by James Reardon and Kenelm Foss and starring James Reardon, Dorothy Minto and Hayford Hobbs. It is an adaptation of the play Le Zebre by Paul Armont and Nicolas Nancey. It was remade as a film of the same name in 1927.

Cast
 James Reardon - James Reardon
 Dorothy Minto - Kiki
 Hayford Hobbs - Maurice Polignac
 Pauline Peters - Lucienne Bocard
 Peggy Marsh - Suzanne Polignac
 Will Corrie - Gallipot
 Lyell Johnstone - Tricassin
 Billy Armstrong - Sox
 Blanche Churms - Juliette
 Douglas Munro - Gendarme
 Joe Peterman - Manager
 George Bellamy - Spiritualist

References

External links

1920 films
1920 comedy films
Films directed by Kenelm Foss
British films based on plays
British comedy films
British black-and-white films
British silent feature films
1920s English-language films
1920s British films
Silent comedy films